European route E 673 is a road part of the International E-road network. It begins in Lugoj and ends in Deva.

Route 
 
: Lugoj - Ilia (Towards Deva )

External links 
 UN Economic Commission for Europe: Overall Map of E-road Network (2007)
 International E-road network

699671
Roads in Romania